Space Cadet is a 2011 graphic novel written by Kid Koala, and was released on September 19 in the UK and Europe, and October 25 in North America. Like his previous graphic novel, Nufonia Must Fall, Space Cadet comes with a soundtrack CD. Drawn completely on etchboards, the story is about a girl astronaut and was inspired by the birth of Kid Koala's daughter Maple.

References

External links 
 Space Cadet official blog post

Kid Koala albums
American graphic novels
2011 graphic novels